Panepistimio metro station can refer to two metro stations in Greece:

Panepistimio metro station (Athens), part of the Athens Metro system, which entered service in 2000
Panepistimio metro station (Thessaloniki), part of the Thessaloniki Metro system, to enter into service in 2020